Platysomatini is a tribe of clown beetles in the family Histeridae. There are at least 30 genera and 380 described species in Platysomatini.

See also
For a list of genera in this tribe, see List of Histerinae genera

References

External links

 

Histeridae
Articles created by Qbugbot